The following outline is provided as an overview of and topical guide to São Tomé and Príncipe:

São Tomé and Príncipe – island nation located in the Gulf of Guinea, off the western equatorial coast of Africa. Both islands are part of an extinct volcanic mountain range. São Tomé, the sizable southern island, is situated just north of the equator. It was named in honor of Saint Thomas by Portuguese explorers who happened to arrive at the island on his feast day. São Tomé and Príncipe is the second-smallest African country in terms of population (the Seychelles being the smallest). It is the smallest country in the world that is not a former British overseas territory, a former United States trusteeship, or one of the European microstates. It is also the smallest Portuguese-speaking country.

General reference 

 Pronunciation: 
 Common English country name:  São Tomé and Príncipe
 Official English country name:  (The) Democratic Republic of São Tomé and Príncipe
 Common endonym(s):  
 Official endonym(s):  
 Adjectival(s): São Toméan
 Demonym(s):
 Etymology: Name of São Tomé and Príncipe
 ISO country codes:  ST, STP, 678
 ISO region codes:  See ISO 3166-2:ST
 Internet country code top-level domain:  .st

Geography of São Tomé and Príncipe 

Geography of São Tomé and Príncipe
 São Tomé and Príncipe is: an island country consisting of two islands
 Location:
 Eastern Hemisphere, on the Equator
 Atlantic Ocean
 Gulf of Guinea
 Africa (though not on the mainland)
 Time zone:  Coordinated Universal Time UTC+00
 Extreme points of São Tomé and Príncipe
 High:  Pico de São Tomé on São Tomé Island 
 Low:  Gulf of Guinea 0 m
 Land boundaries:  none
 Coastline:  Gulf of Guinea 209 km
 Population of São Tomé and Príncipe: 158,000  - 181st most populous country

 Area of São Tomé and Príncipe: 964
 Atlas of São Tomé and Príncipe

Environment of São Tomé and Príncipe 

Environment of São Tomé and Príncipe
 Wildlife of São Tomé and Príncipe
 Fauna of São Tomé and Príncipe
 Birds of São Tomé and Príncipe
 Mammals of São Tomé and Príncipe

Natural geographic features of São Tomé and Príncipe 

List of landforms of São Tomé and Príncipe
 Glaciers in São Tomé and Príncipe: none 
 Islands of São Tomé and Príncipe
 Mountains of São Tomé and Príncipe
 Volcanoes in São Tomé and Príncipe
 Rivers of São Tomé and Príncipe
 Valleys of São Tomé and Príncipe
 World Heritage Sites in São Tomé and Príncipe: None

Regions of São Tomé and Príncipe 

Regions of São Tomé and Príncipe

Ecoregions of São Tomé and Príncipe 

List of ecoregions in São Tomé and Príncipe

Administrative divisions of São Tomé and Príncipe 

Administrative divisions of São Tomé and Príncipe
 Autonomous Region of Príncipe
 Districts of São Tomé and Príncipe

Districts of São Tomé and Príncipe 

Districts of São Tomé and Príncipe

Demography of São Tomé and Príncipe 

Demographics of São Tomé and Príncipe

Government and politics of São Tomé and Príncipe 

 Form of government: unitary semi-presidential representative democratic republic
 Capital of São Tomé and Príncipe: São Tomé
 Elections in São Tomé and Príncipe
 Political parties in São Tomé and Príncipe

Branches of the government of São Tomé and Príncipe 

Government of São Tomé and Príncipe

Executive branch of the government of São Tomé and Príncipe 
 Head of state: President of São Tomé and Príncipe,
 Head of government: Prime Minister of São Tomé and Príncipe,

Legislative branch of the government of São Tomé and Príncipe 

 Parliament of São Tomé and Príncipe (bicameral)
 Upper house: Senate of São Tomé and Príncipe
 Lower house: House of Commons of São Tomé and Príncipe

Judicial branch of the government of São Tomé and Príncipe 

Court system of São Tomé and Príncipe

Foreign relations of São Tomé and Príncipe 

Foreign relations of São Tomé and Príncipe
 Diplomatic missions in São Tomé and Príncipe
 Diplomatic missions of São Tomé and Príncipe

International organization membership 
The Democratic Republic of São Tomé and Príncipe is a member of:

African, Caribbean, and Pacific Group of States (ACP)
African Development Bank Group (AfDB)
African Union (AU)
Comunidade dos Países de Língua Portuguesa (CPLP)
Food and Agriculture Organization (FAO)
Group of 77 (G77)
International Bank for Reconstruction and Development (IBRD)
International Civil Aviation Organization (ICAO)
International Criminal Court (ICCt) (signatory)
International Criminal Police Organization (Interpol)
International Development Association (IDA)
International Federation of Red Cross and Red Crescent Societies (IFRCS)
International Finance Corporation (IFC)
International Fund for Agricultural Development (IFAD)
International Labour Organization (ILO)
International Maritime Organization (IMO)
International Monetary Fund (IMF)
International Olympic Committee (IOC)
International Organization for Migration (IOM) (observer)
International Red Cross and Red Crescent Movement (ICRM)

International Telecommunication Union (ITU)
International Trade Union Confederation (ITUC)
Inter-Parliamentary Union (IPU)
Nonaligned Movement (NAM)
Organisation internationale de la Francophonie (OIF)
Organisation for the Prohibition of Chemical Weapons (OPCW)
União Latina
United Nations (UN)
United Nations Conference on Trade and Development (UNCTAD)
United Nations Educational, Scientific, and Cultural Organization (UNESCO)
United Nations Industrial Development Organization (UNIDO)
Universal Postal Union (UPU)
World Confederation of Labour (WCL)
World Food Program (WFP)
World Health Organization (WHO)
World Intellectual Property Organization (WIPO)
World Meteorological Organization (WMO)
World Tourism Organization (UNWTO)
World Trade Organization (WTO) (observer)

Law and order in São Tomé and Príncipe 

Law of São Tomé and Príncipe
 Constitution of São Tomé and Príncipe
 Human rights in São Tomé and Príncipe
 LGBT rights in São Tomé and Príncipe
 São Toméan National Police Force

Military of São Tomé and Príncipe 

Military of São Tomé and Príncipe
 Command
 Commander-in-chief:
 Forces

Local government in São Tomé and Príncipe 

Local government in São Tomé and Príncipe

History of São Tomé and Príncipe 

History of São Tomé and Príncipe
 Timeline of the history of São Tomé and Príncipe
 Current events of São Tomé and Príncipe

Culture of São Tomé and Príncipe 

Culture of São Tomé and Príncipe
 Cuisine of São Tomé and Príncipe
 Languages of São Tomé and Príncipe
 National symbols of São Tomé and Príncipe
 Coat of arms of São Tomé and Príncipe
 Flag of São Tomé and Príncipe
 Public holidays in São Tomé and Príncipe
 Religion in São Tomé and Príncipe
 Islam in São Tomé and Príncipe
 Sikhism in São Tomé and Príncipe
 World Heritage Sites in São Tomé and Príncipe: None

Art in São Tomé and Príncipe 
 Music of São Tomé and Príncipe

Sports in São Tomé and Príncipe 

Sports in São Tomé and Príncipe
 Football in São Tomé and Príncipe
 São Tomé and Príncipe at the Olympics

The country's basketball activities are administered by the Federação Santomense de Basquetebol.

Economy and infrastructure of São Tomé and Príncipe 

Economy of São Tomé and Príncipe
 Economic rank, by nominal GDP (2007): 188th (one hundred and eighty eighth)
 Banking in São Tomé and Príncipe
 National Bank of São Tomé and Príncipe
 Communications in São Tomé and Príncipe
 Companies of São Tomé and Príncipe
Currency of São Tomé and Príncipe: Dobra
ISO 4217: STD
 Transport in São Tomé and Príncipe
 Airports in São Tomé and Príncipe

Education in São Tomé and Príncipe 

Education in São Tomé and Príncipe

See also 

São Tomé and Príncipe
List of São Tomé and Príncipe-related topics
List of international rankings
Member state of the United Nations
Outline of Africa
Outline of geography

References

External links 

 Government
Presidência da República Democrática de São Tomé e Príncipe - President of the Democratic Republic of São Tomé and Príncipe (official site, Portuguese)
Assembleia Nacional de São Tomé e Príncipe - National Assembly of São Tomé and Príncipe (official site, Portuguese)
Instituto Nacional de Estatística - National statistics institute (Portuguese)
São Tomé and Príncipe Government & Political Resources Page

 News
allAfrica - São Tomé and Príncipe

 Overviews
BBC News - Country Profile: São Tomé and Príncipe
CIA World Factbook - São Tomé and Príncipe

 Economy
Nations Encyclopedia:São Tomé and Príncipe:Banking and Securities
Central Bank of São Tomé and Príncipe

 Tourism
Site Oficial da Direcção do Turismo e Hotelaria de São Tomé e Príncipe
www.saotome.st - Independent tourism site How to get there, where to stay, activities, photos
São Tomé e Príncipe

Local travel agency Navetur-Equatour 

 Environment
Gulf of Guinea Conservation Group 

 Other
 Article on recent politics:  
  Associação Caué, Amigos de São Tomé e Príncipe
  Chocolate de São Tomé e Príncipe
 Forum STP

São Tomé and Príncipe
São Tomé and Príncipe